Janine Boissard (born 18 December 1932, in Paris) is a French writer, best known for her book series L’Esprit de famille (1979–1984), which was adapted into an eponymous French film in 1979 and an eponymous television series in 1982.

References 

1932 births
Living people
French writers